The flag of Turkmenistan features a white crescent (symbol of Islam) and five stars representing the five regions of the country and the Five Pillars of Islam. Placed upon a green field is a symbolic representation of the country's famous carpet industry. It was introduced as the flag of Turkmenistan on 27 September 1992 to replace the Soviet-era flag which consisted of a red background with two light blue bars in the middle. The modified version with a 2:3 ratio was adopted on 23 January 2001. State Flag and Constitution Day is celebrated on 18 May.

Description

It features a green field with a vertical red stripe near the hoist side, containing five carpet guls (designs used in producing rugs) stacked above two crossed olive branches similar to those on the flag of the United Nations; a white waxing crescent moon, typical of Turkic and Islamic symbology, and five white five-pointed stars appear in the upper corner of the field just to the fly side of the red stripe.

The green and red colors appear in this flag because they have been venerated historically by the Turkmen. The waxing crescent moon symbolizes the hope of the country for a shining future and the stars represent the five provinces (welayatlar) of Turkmenistan: Ahal, Balkan, Dashoguz, Lebap and Mary.

The five traditional carpet designs along the hoist make the flag of Turkmenistan the most complex national flag design in the world. They represent the five major tribes or houses, and form motifs in the country's state emblem and flag. These Turkmen tribes in traditional order (as well as top to bottom) are Teke (Tekke), Yomut (Yomud), Saryk (Saryq), Chowdur (Choudur), and Arsary (Ersary). The middle design may also represent the Salyr (Salor), a tribe that declined as a result of military defeat before the modern period.

History
The flag of the Russian Empire was the official flag of Turkmenistan until the Russian Revolution.

Before the collapse of the Soviet Union in 1991, Turkmenistan had a flag similar to all other Soviet Republics; see Flag of the Turkmen SSR.

After independence in 1991, Turkmenistan adopted a flag very similar to the current design, on 19 February 1992. However, the designs on the left were different. On 1 February 1997, an olive branch was added to symbolise the peace-loving nature of the Turkmen people. The positioning of the crescent and stars was also changed, with the crescent positioned roughly to its current position but with the stars in a much more uneven position. In 2001 the flag changed from 1:2 to 2:3 and the green field was made lighter.

Military flags
All flags of the Armed Forces of the Republic of Turkmenistan mimic the Soviet era designs.

See also
Emblem of Turkmenistan

References

External links

 
 Turkmenistan - vexillographia

National flags
 
Flags introduced in 1992
Flags introduced in 1997
Flags with star and crescent
Flags introduced in 2001
Flag